The Hovis International was a women's amateur 72-hole stroke-play event. It was held from 1964 to 1972. The event continued as the Newmark International. Some of the later events were open to professionals.

Winners

References

Amateur golf tournaments in the United Kingdom
Women's golf in the United Kingdom
1964 establishments in England
1978 disestablishments in England
Recurring sporting events established in 1964
Recurring sporting events disestablished in 1978